Gnathothlibus erotus, the white-brow hawkmoth, is a moth of the family Sphingidae. The species was first described by Pieter Cramer in 1777.

Taxonomic notes
Gnathothlibus erotus  (Oriental tropics)
Gnathothlibus erotus eras (from the Moluccas eastwards) transferred to Gnathothlibus eras

Distribution
This species can bes found from India to Borneo and from Australia and Cook Islands to New Caledonia and eastwards into Polynesia as far as Pitcairn Island.

Description
The wingspan is about 70 mm. Adults have brown forewings with a faint pattern of light and dark markings, and bright yellow hindwings with dark margins. 

Larvae have been recorded on a wide range of plants, including Ipomoea batatas, Vitis vinifera, Dillenia alata, Escallonia macrantha, Melastoma affine, Pentas lanceolata, Cayratia acris, Cayratia clematidea, Cayratia trifolia, Leea indica Parthenocissus quinquefolia, Hibbertia scandens, Cissus and Morinda.

References

External links
Gnathothlibus erotus Cook Islands Biodiversity Database

Gnathothlibus
Moths described in 1777